Song of Songs is a 2015 Ukrainian drama film directed by Eva Neymann. It was screened in the Contemporary World Cinema section of the 2015 Toronto International Film Festival. It was named as one of three films shortlisted as the Ukrainian submission for the Academy Award for Best Foreign Language Film, but it was not selected.

Plot 
The film poetically depicts the Jewish town of the early 20th century, where ten-year-old Shimek and Buzya live. Of course, she is a princess and he is a prince. They live in neighboring palaces in the same yard. Shimek begins to realize his true feelings for Buza only years later, away from home, when he learns that she is marrying someone else.

Cast
 Karen Badalov as Shimek's father
 Vitalina Bibliv as Shimek's mother
 Mikhail Bogdasarov as Uncle
 Yevheniy Kogan as Young Shimek
 Arina Postolova as Buzya
 Arseni Semyonov as Shimek
 Vsevolod Shilovsky as Melamed

Accolades

References

External links
 

2015 films
2015 drama films
Ukrainian drama films
2010s Russian-language films
Yiddish culture in Ukraine